Gasan (가산 / 架山) is a mountain of South Korea (경북). It has an elevation of 901.6 metres

See also
List of mountains of Korea

References

Mountains of South Korea
Mountains of North Gyeongsang Province